Junior Baptiste Tchamadeu (born 22 December 2003) is an English professional footballer who plays as a right back for  club Colchester United.

Career
Born in Redbridge, London, England, Tchamadeu joined League Two side Colchester United from Charlton Athletic in 2020.

He became Colchester United's youngest ever starting debutant on 5 December 2020 when he was named in the starting eleven for Colchester's 2–1 victory against Grimsby Town. He was aged 16-years and 349 days old.

On 5 July 2021, he signed a three-year contract extension with the club.

On 19 October 2021, he was sent off for the first time in his career for violent conduct following an altercation with Bristol Rovers' Trevor Clarke. On 26 March 2022, Tchamadeu scored a first career senior goal with a 95th minute winner against Tranmere Rovers securing a vital win to move Colchester closer to safety. At the end of the 2021–22 season, Tchamadeu won the EFL League Two Apprentice of the Season award at the 2022 EFL Awards.

He was awarded the EFL Young Player of the Month award for January 2023 having featured in every minute played as they took thirteen points from six matches.

Career statistics

Honours
Individual
EFL League Two Apprentice of the Season: 2021–22
EFL Young Player of the Month: January 2023

References

External links

2003 births
Living people
English footballers
People from the London Borough of Redbridge
Association football fullbacks
Charlton Athletic F.C. players
Colchester United F.C. players
English Football League players
Black British sportspeople
English people of Cameroonian descent